Sedgley Park Rugby Union Football Club, the 1st XV team of which play under the name of Sedgley Tigers, is a rugby union club based in Whitefield, in the Metropolitan Borough of Bury, Greater Manchester. They play in the fourth tier of the English rugby union league hierarchy and have played in National League 2 North since season 2013–14. The Tigers nickname is due to their striped kit.

History
Sedgley Park is a district of Prestwich approximately two miles north of Manchester city centre. In 1932 at a public meeting in a temperance bar, the club began. The very first ground was a farmer's field in Whitefield, and the club has never been based in Sedgley Park. Despite primitive conditions - cowshed for changing, farmyard pump for washing - the new club thrived.

A clubhouse had already been built and three regular teams were being fielded before World War II broke out in 1939. They survived the war years, and also a difficult period afterward when they lost their rented ground. For two years all games were played away, with barely enough playing members for two teams, until in 1955 they moved to their present site, Park Lane in Whitefield, with an immediate and spectacular improvement in playing standards. During the next twenty years Sedgley Park became a successful and respected junior club but, in the years before league rugby, advancement was practically impossible, especially for a club notorious for its muddy pitches; they were often nicknamed 'Sludgley Park' by other teams! The decision to build a large, two-story clubhouse was arguably the most significant one in their history.

Building began in 1978 at a time when the club was enjoying great success on the field, and was completed in time for the 1982 Golden Jubilee season; it had been a risky venture at the time, but it set them apart from all the local junior clubs. When the Courage Leagues began in 1987 they had progressed far enough to be placed in North West 2 (level 8), from which they gained promotion at the first attempt. They remained in North West 1 for seven years; meanwhile, the club was expanding in other directions with a huge increase in quantity and quality at the age-group level of the game.

When the game went 'open' in the middle 1990s, Sedgley Park was ready for the next leap forward. Promotion was achieved three years in succession; the clubhouse was extended; the two pitches became one, now in excellent condition, with floodlights and terracing. A newly purchased field, just across the road, provided three more much needed pitches and floodlit training. 

Another promotion, in 2001, took them to National League Two, level 3 of the English game. The Tigers attained League One status in 2004, their 6th promotion since 1987, but were relegated back to level three in 2009.

Honours
 North West 2 champions: 1987–88
 North West 1 champions: 1994–95
 North 1 champions: 1996–97
 National League 2 (north v south) promotion play-off winner: 2000–01
 Lancashire Cup winners (4 times): 2002, 2004, 2007, 2013
 National Division 2 champions: 2003–04

Current standings

References

External links
 The Official Site of Sedgley Park RUFC
 Sedgley Park on itsrugby.co.uk

English rugby union teams
Rugby clubs established in 1932
Sport in the Metropolitan Borough of Bury
Whitefield, Greater Manchester